"Sandstorm" is a song by the Liverpool Britpop band Cast. The song is the third single released from the band's debut studio album, All Change (1995). "Sandstorm" peaked at number eight on the UK Singles Chart in January 1996.

Track listings
UK and European CD single
 "Sandstorm"
 "Hourglass"
 "Back of My Mind" (live)
 "Alright" (live)

UK cassette single
A1. "Sandstorm"
B1. "Hourglass"
B2. "Back of My Mind" (live)

European 7-inch jukebox single
A. "Sandstorm"
B. "Hourglass"

Personnel
Cast
 John Power – vocals, guitar
 Peter Wilkinson – backing vocals, bass
 Liam "Skin" Tyson – guitar
 Keith O'Neill – drums

Production
 John Leckie – producer, mixing

Charts

References

1995 songs
1996 singles
Cast (band) songs
Polydor Records singles
Song recordings produced by John Leckie
Songs written by John Power (musician)